Mount Williamson, at an elevation of , is the second-highest mountain in both the Sierra Nevada range and the state of California, and the sixth-highest peak in the contiguous United States.

Geography 

Williamson stands in the John Muir Wilderness of the Inyo National Forest. It is more remote than Whitney in terms of access; however, as it sits east of the crest, it is actually a bit closer to the Owens Valley floor than Whitney. This makes it an imposing mountain, and far less of a popular climb than its higher neighbor.

History 
The mountain is named for Lt. Robert Stockton Williamson (1825–1882), who conducted one of the Pacific Railroad Surveys in Southern California.

The first recorded ascent of Mount Williamson was made in 1884 by W. L. Hunter and C. Mulholland, by way of the Southeast Slopes Route. The first ascent of the West Side Route was made in 1896 by Bolton C. Brown and Lucy Brown. New routes continued to be put up on the harder faces at least through the 1980s.

Climbing 
The standard ascent route is the West Side Route, accessed from Shepherd's Pass. From the pass, one travels across the Williamson Bowl, which lies between Mount Williamson and Mount Tyndall, part of the Sierra Crest. The bowl is home to five high alpine lakes. Technically easier, but with a more difficult approach which can involve route finding and bushwhacking, is the Southeast Slopes Route, rising from George Creek. Other routes exist on the mountain, including a significant technical route on the North Rib (Grade IV, 5.7).

Climbing Mount Williamson is made more difficult by the lengthy and strenuous approach.

Mount Williamson is in the California Bighorn Sheep Zoological Area and these rare animals can often be seen on the lower slopes during the winter when heavy snows drive the sheep down from their summer grazing areas. From 1981 until 2010 the California Bighorn Sheep Zoological Area was closed to access for much of the year, but late in 2010, the Inyo National Forest Service declined to renew the closure, opening the area to access year-round.

See also
 
  
 List of mountain peaks of California

References

External links
 
 

Fourteeners of California
Mountains of Inyo County, California
Mountains of the John Muir Wilderness
Mount Williamson
Mountains of Northern California